Wolrige-Gordon is a surname. Notable people with the surname include:

John MacLeod of MacLeod (1935–2007), born John Wolrige-Gordon, 29th chief of Clan MacLeod
Patrick Wolrige-Gordon (1935–2002), Scottish politician

See also
Gordon (surname)

Compound surnames